This article is about 1984-1990 seasons of Lucky-Goldstar FC.

Seasons statistics

All competitions records 

[1] In 1986, Tournament name was Korea Professional Football Championship
[2] In 1988 and 1989, Tournament name was National Football Championship

K League Championship records

Seasoans Summary

1984 season summary

1985 season summary

1986 season summary

1987 season summary

1988 season summary

1989 season summary

1990 season summary

Kits

First Kit

Second Kit

Third Kit

※ Notes
(1) In only 1987 season, All K League clubs wore white jerseys in home match, coloured jersey in away match like Major League Baseball.

Transfers

1984 season

Founding members

In

1984 season

In

Rookie Free Agent

Out

Loan & Military service

1986 season

In

Rookie Free Agent

Out

Loan & Military service

1987 season

In

Rookie Free Agent

Out

Loan & Military service

1988 season

In

Rookie Draft

Out

Loan & Military service

1989 season

In

Rookie Draft

Out

Loan & Military service

1990 season

In

Rookie Draft

Out

Loan & Military service

See also
 FC Seoul

References

 FC Seoul Matchday Magazines  
 The K League history at K League official website

External links
 FC Seoul Official Website 

1984–1990